Sonora is a small fishing and mining community in the Canadian province of Nova Scotia, located in the Municipality of the District of Saint Mary's in Guysborough County.

References

External links
Sonora on Destination Nova Scotia
Photo Fisheries and Oceans Canada

Communities in Guysborough County, Nova Scotia
General Service Areas in Nova Scotia